| website      = 
}}

Shantanu Moitra (born 22 January 1968) is an Indian score composer, musician and pianist who has composed songs for the Hindi film industry, and is most known for his scores in the films Parineeta (2005), Hazaaron Khwaishein Aisi (2005), Lage Raho Munnabhai (2006) and 3 Idiots (2009), and private albums, Mann ke Manjeere and Ab ke Saawan sung by Shubha Mudgal. In 2014, he received the National Film Award for Best Music Direction (Background Score) for Na Bangaaru Talli.

Early life and education
Shantanu was born in Lucknow, where his father came from a Bengali musical family. He was very young when he moved to Delhi with his family, where initially he lived in Patel Nagar in West Delhi, and studied at Springdales School, Pusa Road. There, he was the leader and singer of a band, and in 1982, the band hosted the school's first rock show. "What was even better was receiving an award in school for my contribution to music at a time when my school, Springdales in Delhi, didn't usually give awards for music. When I look back now, I think the award instilled huge confidence in me," he said.

They also received musical training from urban-folk singer, Sushmit Bose, a Springdales alumnus, who would occasionally drop in and teach them. Later he moved to Chittaranjan Park in South Delhi.

He studied at Deshbandhu College, Kalkaji, Delhi University and has a degree in Economics.

Career
Moitra started his career as a client servicing executive at an ad agency, while music remained a hobby. He started composing music for advertising jingles accidentally, when he was asked to compose a jingle at the last minute by Pradeep Sarkar, then the Creative Head of the agency. The jingle was "Bole mere lips. I love Uncle Chipps" for the chips brand Uncle Chipps, which became an instant hit. He later composed several jingles for Pradeep Sarkar, and several advertising brands.

This led to composing music for Indipop albums that were hits including Ab ke Saawan, Mann ke Manjeere: an album of women's dreams for Breakthrough, and Sapna Dekha Hai Maine (2003) for Shubha Mudgal.

Moitra moved to Mumbai in 2002, when he started working for Sudhir Mishra's Hazaaron Khwaishein Aisi, his first signed film. He soon formed a team with lyricist Swanand Kirkire, starting with the song "Bawara Mann..". Even before Parineeta was made, he had created a song called Raath Hamari To, sung by Chitra, which Vidhu Vinod Chopra the producer of Parineeta heard, and subsequently on his recommendation, he went on do his first Bollywood project- Parineeta (2005), directed by Pradeep Sarkar.

Moitra gained recognition with his music in Parineeta (2005). His music was critically acclaimed and he received a nomination for the Filmfare Best Music Director Award. That same year he won the Filmfare RD Burman Award for New Music Talent. In 2009, he composed the score for his first Bengali film, Antaheen.

He was also a judge for two seasons of Sa Re Ga Ma Pa Bangla, a regional spinoff of the show Sa Re Ga Ma Pa.

He also wrote the book Ferari Mon - Memories by Santanu Moitra in Bengali, published by Sudhangshu Sekhar Dey, Dey's Publishing.

Shantanu also undertook a 100-day journey across the Himalayas in 2016 along with Dhritiman Mukherjee which was documented and published on YouTube called “100 days in Himalayas” produced by Roundglass.

Discography

As a music director

As a playback singer

As a background score composer

Awards 
National Film Awards
National Film Award for Best Music Direction (Background Score) -Na Bangaaru Talli (2013)

Filmfare Awards
Filmfare RD Burman Award for New Music Talent – Parineeta(2006)

Mirchi Music Awards
 Background Score of the Year - Madras Cafe (2013)

References

External links
Shantanu Moitra, official website

Shantanu Moitra news article

1968 births
Living people
Bengali Hindus
Bengali musicians
Musicians from Lucknow
Delhi University alumni
Indian pop composers
Filmfare Awards winners
Hindi film score composers
Jingle composers
20th-century Indian composers
Best Background Score National Film Award winners
Indian male film score composers
20th-century male musicians